General Sir Robert Dundas Whigham,  (5 August 1865 – 23 June 1950) was a Scottish British Army officer and a former Adjutant-General to the Forces.

Early life
Whigham was born in 1865, the son of David Dundas Whigham and Ellen Murray (née Campbell). His father was a lawyer and a cricket player. His sister was Sybil Whigham who was a successful tennis player; another brother was the golfer and journalist H. J. Whigham. Their sister Molly Whigham also played golf.

Military career
Educated at Fettes College in Edinburgh and at the Royal Military College, Sandhurst, Robert Whigham was commissioned into the 1st Battalion Royal Warwickshire Regiment as a lieutenant on 9 May 1885.

He was promoted to captain on 3 March 1892, when he became Adjutant for the Royal Warwickshire Regiment, and was seconded to the Egyptian Army in 1897, where he served in the Nile Expedition of 1898 with the 12th Sudanese Battalion.
During the Second Boer War he served first 1899–1900 as Aide-de-camp to Major-General Hector MacDonald, in command of the Highland brigade, and was promoted to major on 1 August 1900. He was later at Army Headquarters in South Africa, and for his service was appointed a Companion of the Distinguished Service Order (DSO) in the South Africa Honours list published on 26 June 1902. Following the end of the war, he returned to the United Kingdom in August 1902, and then became Brigade Major for 2nd Army Corps on 1 November 1902.

He also served in the First World War with the British Expeditionary Force. He was appointed Deputy Chief of the Imperial General Staff at the War Office in 1915. He became General Officer Commanding 59th (2nd North Midland) Division in June 1918 and GOC 62nd (2nd West Riding) Division in August 1918.

After the War he became General Officer Commanding of the Light Division in the British Army of the Rhine. He was appointed General Officer Commanding 3rd Division in 1919, Adjutant-General to the Forces in 1923 and General Officer Commanding-in-Chief for Eastern Command in 1927. He retired in 1931.

Family
In 1899 he married Isabel Adeline Muntz.

References

|-

|-

|-

|-

|-

1865 births
1950 deaths
British Army generals
British Army generals of World War I
British Army personnel of the Mahdist War
British Army personnel of the Second Boer War
Commandeurs of the Légion d'honneur
Companions of the Distinguished Service Order
Knights Commander of the Order of St Michael and St George
Knights Grand Cross of the Order of the Bath
People educated at Fettes College
Royal Warwickshire Fusiliers officers
Graduates of the Royal Military College, Sandhurst
Robert